The Municipality of the District of Chester is a Nova Scotia district municipality occupying the northeastern half of Lunenburg County, Canada.

The district boundary was originally drawn for court sessional purposes, before the existence of elected local government. In 1879 it became a district municipality, to provide local government to the residents who live outside incorporated towns. under the authority of the Municipal Government Act of 1998.

The Municipality of the District of Chester is also a census division for Statistics Canada.

Municipal Council 
The Municipality of Chester has a town council that consists of 7 councillors and a warden who is appointed by the council, the municipal council was incorporated and founded in 1879. Elections to the council occur every four years unless there is a vacancy. If there is a vacancy in a district, a by-election occurs and the person who is elected will serve their term until the next scheduled election in the four-year cycle.

Municipal Districts 
 District 1: includes the communities Aspotogan, Bayswater, Blandford, Northwest Cove, Deep Cove, East River, and part of East Chester.
 District 2: Hubbards, Mill Cove, Fox Point, Simms Settlement, Mill Lake, and The Lodge.
 District 3: Chester village and part of East Chester.
 District 4: Chester Basin, Chester Grant, and part of Middle River.
 District 5: Gold River, Beech Hill, Western Shore, Martin's Point, and part of Martin's River.
 District 6: Seffernsville, Lake Ramsay, Forties, Franey Corner, and Fraxville.
 District 7: Windsor Road, Canaan, Sherwood, and Marriotts Cove.

Council Sessions 
The current warden of the Municipality is Allen Webber, and the current deputy warden is Floyd Shatford

*Following the 2021 Nova Scotia general election, District 3 councillor Danielle Barkhouse was elected as MLA to the riding of Chester-St. Margaret's. Following her election, she tendered her resignation from the municipal council, triggering a special election where Derek Wells was elected councillor, for the remainder of the 2020-2024 council session.

Nova Scotian Municipal politics do not have party affiliations.

Departments and services 
There are four departments in the district:
 Community Development & Recreation
 Corporate & Strategic Management
 Financial & Information Services
 Infrastructure & Operations

Demographics 

Parks, playgrounds and open spaces 
The municipality operates  of trail on the former railway from Martins River to Hubbards. The trails are open to walkers, off-road vehicles, cyclists and horseback riders.

Parks and outdoor areas include Anvil Park in Chester Basin, East River Property, Village of Chester Gazebo, Wild Rose Park in Western Shore, a Green Gym Park in Chester Basin, Castle Rock in East River. There are six beaches along the coast, public wharves and launches, and several islands preserved for public use (including four owned by the Municipality of Chester).

The Municipality of the District of Chester also has two playgrounds; Croft Road Playground located in Chester Basin and Gold River Playground located at the former Gold River Elementary School.

Within the Village of Chester there is a skate park that was opened in 2009 after five years of planning and fundraising.

Schools 
The Municipality of the District of Chester has five schools within its boundaries. All five are open to the public for community use. These schools are Forest Heights Community School (FHCS) in Chester Grant; Aspotogan Consolidated Elementary School (ACES)  in Mill Cove; Chester Area Middle School  in Chester; Chester District Elementary School  in Chester, and New Ross Consolidated School  in New Ross.

Economy 
The Municipality identifies five sectors: arts, culture & recreation; business services; construction; green industries; and niche manufacturing.

Arts, Culture & Recreation 
The Municipality has a high concentration of arts, entertainment, and recreation workers with artist-in-residents programs, galleries, a theatre, golf courses, museums, marinas, and the first and only Nordic spa in Nova Scotia. Productions filmed in the Municipality include:

 Moonshine
 The Sinner
 Good House
 Candles on Bay Street
 Christmas With Holly
 Delores Claiborne
 Haven
 The Curse of Oak Island
 The Healer
 Two if by Sea
 Feudal

References

Communities in Lunenburg County, Nova Scotia
Chester